The Symes Hotel is a historic building in Hot Springs, Montana. It was built in Mission/Spanish Revival style during 1929–1930. It was listed on the National Register of Historic Places in 1998; the listing included 10 contributing buildings and one contributing structure. It has also been known as Symes Medical Springs and as Symes Medicine Springs.

It was built for $50,000 by Fred Symes. It had 20 baths to start, and did well even during the Depression.

References 

Hotel buildings on the National Register of Historic Places in Montana
Mission Revival architecture in Montana
Hotel buildings completed in 1930
National Register of Historic Places in Sanders County, Montana
1930 establishments in Montana
Tourist attractions in Sanders County, Montana